This is a round-up of the 2004 Sligo Senior Football Championship. Tourlestrane won the title for the seventh time, defeating St. Mary's after a replay. Castleconnor were relegated, but early in 2005 the club requested that they remain in the Senior grade, which was agreed.

Group stages

The Championship was contested by 14 teams, divided into two groups of four, and two of three. The top two sides in each group advanced to the quarter-finals, with the remaining sides facing the Relegation playoffs to secure Senior status for 2005.

Group A

Group B

Group C

Group D

Playoffs

Two groups required playoffs. A week after their drawn game, St. Mary's and Bunninadden met again to decide second place in Group A. St. Mary's won out, though only after extra time. In Group C, Ballymote had defeated Easkey, but in the playoff the result was reversed, as Easkey edged through by the minimum.

Quarterfinals

The quarter finals of the Championship saw the demise of holders Curry, eliminated by St. Mary's. Elsewhere Coolera/Strandhill, Tourlestrane and Easkey won, Tourlestrane beating Shamrock Gaels after a replay. Eastern Harps' defeat to Coolera/Strandhill meant that the East Sligo club did not reach the last four for the first time in a decade.

Semifinals

Both semi-final pairings had previously met in the group stages. St. Mary's repeated their victory over Coolera, but Tourlestrane, this time not having to travel to Tireragh, gained revenge over Easkey.

Last eight

Sligo Senior Football Championship Final

Sligo Senior Football Championship Final Replay

Relegation

References
 Sligo Champion (July–October 2004)
 Sligo Weekender (July–October 2004)

Sligo Senior Football Championship
Sligo Senior Football Championship